The 2011–12 South Dakota State Jackrabbits men's basketball team represented South Dakota State University during the 2011–12 NCAA Division I men's basketball season. The Jackrabbits, led by 17th year head coach Scott Nagy, played their home games at Frost Arena and are members of The Summit League. They finished the season 27–8, 15–3 in The Summit League to finish in second place. They were champions of The Summit League Basketball tournament to earn the conference's automatic bid into the 2012 NCAA tournament. This was the Jackrabbits first ever NCAA Division I Tournament appearance. They lost in the second round to Baylor.

Roster 

Source

Schedule

|-
!colspan=9 style=| Exhibition

|-
!colspan=9 style=| Regular season

|-
!colspan=9 style=| Summit League tournament

|-
!colspan=9 style=| NCAA tournament

Source

References

South Dakota State Jackrabbits men's basketball seasons
South Dakota State
South Dakota State
South Dakota State Jackrabbits men's basketball team
South Dakota State Jackrabbits men's basketball team